Thomas or Tom Hunt may refer to:

Politicians
 Thomas Hunt (MP for Bishop's Lynn), (died 1433) MP for Bishop's Lynn
 Thomas Hunt (MP for Bedford fl.1420),  (fl.1420) MP for Bedford
 Thomas Hunt (MP for Great Yarmouth), (died 1560) MP for Great Yarmouth
 Thomas Hunt (MP for Shrewsbury), in 1645 and 1648, MP for Shrewsbury
 Thomas Hunt (Australian politician) (1841–1934)
Tom Hunt (politician), MP for Ipswich elected 2019

Others
 Thomas Hunt (madrigalist) (c. 1580–1658), English composer and madrigalist who contributed to The Triumphs of Oriana, 1601
 Thomas Hunt (footballer) (1908–1975), formerly with Norwich City F.C.
 Thomas Hunt (martyr) (died 1600), Englishman martyred with Thomas Sprott in 1600
 Thomas Hunt (Arabic scholar) (1696–1774), professor of Arabic and of Hebrew at the University of Oxford
 Thomas Hunt (slaver) (17th century), John Smith's lieutenant; took Squanto to Europe from modern-day Massachusetts
 Thomas Hunt (soldier) (1754–1808), American Army officer
 Thomas Hunt (speech therapist) (1802–1851), English inventor of a treatment for stammering
 Thomas Sterry Hunt (1826–1892), American geologist and chemist
 Thomas Cecil Hunt (1901–1980), English physician
Thomas Lorraine Hunt, Canadian-American landscape painter
 Tom Hunt (executive) (1923–2008), American petroleum industry executive
 Tommy Hunt (born 1933), singer
 Tom Hunt (cricketer) (1819–1858), English cricketer

See also
Hunt (surname)